Multi view Video Coding (MVC, also known as MVC 3D) is a stereoscopic video coding standard for video compression that allows for the efficient encoding of video sequences captured simultaneously from multiple camera angles in a single video stream. It uses the 2D plus Delta method and is an amendment to the H.264 (MPEG-4 AVC) video compression standard, developed jointly by MPEG and VCEG, with contributions from a number of companies, primarily Panasonic and LG Electronics.

MVC formatting is intended for encoding stereoscopic (two-view) 3D video, as well as free viewpoint television and multi-view 3D television. The Stereo High profile has been standardized in June 2009; the profile is based on the MVC tool set and is used in stereoscopic Blu-ray 3D releases.

Technical overview
MVC is based on the idea that video recordings of the same scene from multiple angles share many common elements. It is possible to encode all simultaneous frames captured in the same elementary stream and to share as much information as possible across the different layers. This can reduce the size of the encoded video.

Multiview video contains a large amount of inter-view statistical dependencies, since all cameras capture the same scene from different viewpoints. Therefore, combined temporal and inter-view prediction is important for efficient MVC encoding. A frame from a certain camera can be predicted not only from temporally related frames from the same camera, but also from the frames of neighboring cameras. These interdependencies can be used for efficient prediction.

The method for this used in Multiview Video Coding for Blu-ray 3D movies is known as the 2D plus Delta algorithm, and the MVC specification itself is part of the H.264 standard as an amendment in H.264 “Annex H” of the specification.

Open source support mostly missing
 
As of April 2015, there is still no free and open-source software that supports software decoding of the MVC video compression standard. So popular open source H.264 and HEVC (H.265) decoders such as those used in the FFmpeg and Libav libraries simply ignore the additional information for the second view and thus do not show the second view for stereoscopic views. In most cases the reason for this support not being added is that MVC was not considered when the initial core H.264 and HEVC decoders code was written so it was coded in one large chunk, and later amendment would as such often mean a lot of prerequisite code refactoring work and large changes its current architecture, with major work in untangling and reordering some code, and splitting different functions in existing decoder code into smaller chunks for simpler handling to in turn then make amendments such as MVC easier to add.

Some proof-of-concept work has however been done downstream in the past, but never made it upstream into official releases of FFmpeg or Libav.

On March 8, 2016, the situation improved. Version 0.68 of the DirectShow Media Splitter and Decoders Collection LAV Filters was released by developer "Nevcairiel" (who also works for Media Player Classic — Home Cinema (MPC-HC)) with support of H.264 MVC 3D demuxing and decoding. With the aid of this release and FRIM  written by a programmer named “videohelp3d”  it is possible to write an AviSynth script to pre process a H.264 MVC 3D video clip which can then be opened by free 3D video player Bino and then shown as red — cyan anaglyph video for example.

The usage of the FRIM AviSynth plugin (FRIMSource) is described on “videohelp3d” home page. LAV Filters can be used to get audio from H.264 MVC 3D video clip. The developer  posted that in a future release of, it might be possible that LAV Video renders the video as Side-by-Side directly.

Patent holders 
The following organizations hold patents that contributed to the development of MVC technology, listed in a patent pool by MPEG LA.

See also
 2D plus Delta
 2D-plus-depth
 Stereoscopic video coding
 Digital 3D
 Stereoscopic
 TDVision
 3D television
 3DTV
 3D display
 3-D film
 Crosstalk
 Stereoscopy
 3D Blu-ray Disc
 List of 3D films

References

External links
 Mitsubishi Electric Research Laboratories – Multiview Video Coding project
 MPEG – Technologies – Introduction to Multiview Video Coding
 MPEG – Technologies – Introduction to 3D Video
 MPEG – Visions – 3D Video Vision
  Nokia Research Center – Mobile 3D Video project and MVC source code
  NetBlender – MVC encoding solution for 3D Blu-ray authoring
TDVision Systems, Inc – Stereoscopic decoding patents:
 TDVision Systems, Inc – Stereoscopic encoding patent
 TDVision Systems, Inc – Stereoscopic decoding patent

3D imaging
IEC standards
ISO standards
MPEG-4
Open standards covered by patents
Video codecs
Video compression